The 2016 Algerian Cup Final was the 52nd final of the Algerian Cup. The final took place on May 1, 2016, at Stade 5 Juillet 1962 in Algiers with kick-off at 16:00.

Route to the final

Pre-match

Details

External links
soccerway.com

References

Cup
Algerian Cup Finals